The women's 200 metres event at the 2015 Asian Athletics Championships was held on the 6 and 7 of June.

Medalists

Results

Heats
First 2 in each heat (Q) and the next 2 fastest (q) qualified for the final.

Wind:Heat 1: -0.8 m/s, Heat 2: -0.4 m/s, Heat 3: -0.4 m/s

Final
Wind: +0.4 m/s

References

200
200 metres at the Asian Athletics Championships
2015 in women's athletics